Batman: The 12¢ Adventure is a one-shot comic written by Devin Grayson and illustrated by Ramon Bachs with a cover date of October 2004. It is a prelude to the Batman: War Games storyline that ran in 2004 and 2005.

Origins 
From the work of Devin Grayson, DC Comic book writer, comes another compelling tale of grit and action in this one-shot comic book title following the events of the Batman War Games series. Being released on August 4, 2004, for the astonishing price of twelve cents. A one shot title refers to a single stand-alone issue that has a self-contained story and is not a part of an ongoing series. The comic follows Stephanie Brown, Spoiler, as she patrols the streets of Gotham as a solo crusader. On this particular night, a routine mission has turned out to be rather deadly. Meanwhile, Bruce Wayne is attending a hospital dedication where an old adversary lurks to launch their apocalyptic plot. In a matter of a night the face of Gotham will be changed as it becomes the perfect setting for the bloody gang war that is about to commence.

This could be seen as a marketing ploy as well as a loss for DC Comics since the marketing price is set for such a low amount. Which can ultimately serve as a means for consumers to spend more money in the long run. The story can be followed through the Detective Comics #797. Not to mention the story itself has posed to do rather well as Batman: The 12 Cent Adventure has marked the first chapter in the War Games series that lasted for twenty-four more Bat books. A similar ploy occurred on December 27. 2001 and was covered by New York's Entertainment Wire. Entertainment Wire disclosed that Paul Levitz, Executive Vice President and Publisher, announced that January 2, 2002 will be the first time in 40 years that DC Comics will be offering a full-length, 32 page comic book for the minimal price of ten cents. Levitz stated that this was an opportunity to invite Batman fans and new readers into the classic crime noir storyline.

It is only natural to assume that this tactic was used again in order to get current Batman fans hyped for the newest crossover between the Bat family while attracting new fans in order to purchase to purchase an issue and become invested in the DC Franchise. The explosive three-month Batman event WAR GAMES kicks off here, in a special low-priced comic! Batman: The 12 Cent adventure marks more than just the prelude for the War Games, but it is also the very foundation in understanding the history of Stephanie Brown as a character and her future development in later comics.

The illustrator 
Ramon Bachs, the illustrator of Batman: The 12¢ Adventure, began his career in Barcelona, Spain. He joined Joso Comic School where he collaborated with other artists to create a collective piece called Amacỉano and several fanzines. He has stated that a couple of his influences include Jeff Smith and Bruce Timm. His first professional work, Manticore, was created in 1996 with his partner Josep Busquet and edited by Camaleòn Editorial. Because of good reviews of his first piece, his success opened doors for many more opportunities. Though delving into hundreds of new projects, Bachs wished to come back to Manticore's character some day. This led Bachs to make a series of Spanish comics called Yinn (a four-part series for Laberinto),  a prequel called Castor & Pollux (a one-shot for Dude), and two one-shots with Josep Busquet, Saturn Babe and Fanpunter: Goldenpussy.

He then won the award for best new author in Salón del Cómic de Barcelona in 1999, which is the most prominent Comic Convention in Spain. More success transpired when Phil Amara, the publisher of Dark Horse, took notice of Bachs. This is when he began to illustrate more famous titles such as Joker and Mask. Since then Ramon Bachs has been an illustrator for works such as Striker Z, Gen 13 and several Star Wars mini-series such as Jango Fett: Open Seasons, Jedi vs. Sith, Qui-Gon and Obi-Wan: Last Stand on Ord Mantell and Starfighter: Crossbones. He has also been in charge of drawing of the comic series dedicated to the successful film Shrek. Between 2005 and 2006, Bachs drew Generation M with the scriptwriter Paul Jenkins and then Civil War: Frontline #'s 1-11 for the Marvel comics. Though Bachs snags great gigs, he often complains that he is not provided with real material to base his work on and instead is only given previously well-known books to illustrate.  Even when he is given popular comics to continue on, Bachs complained that he was only given a few images for reference. For example, in order to draw Quinlan Vos's character, Bachs wasn't allowed to view Vos when he was a background character in Star Wars: Episode I The Phantom Menace. In addition, Bachs worked on Starfighter: Crossbones in which he illustrated many of the characters from the video game, but claimed that he was denied any access to the game at all.

Bachs considered Jedi Vs. Sith to be his best work with writer Darko Macan, whom they worked in 2001.

Stephanie Brown (Spoiler) 
Stephanie Brown, better known as Spoiler, is a fictional superhero who is commonly associated in the Batman franchise. Stephanie first appeared in the Detective Comics #647 as the daughter of one of Batman's adversaries, the Cluemaster. After his release from Blackgate Penitentiary, he had a relapse and returned to his criminal ways. In order to "spoil" her father's plots Stephanie Brown created an alter ego in order to leave clues of his doing for the Gotham Police Department. As the Cluemaster aimed to rob the charity telethon at the Castleland Park Mall in Evanstown Stephanie met both Batman and Robin for the first time. Their meeting ended on anything, but a high note as Stephanie smacked Robin in the face with a brick for unmasking her and within the same night had to be comforted by Batman into not killing her father due to his countless schemes ruining her life. After Stephanie's father had escaped from prison once again she decided to reclaim her role as a caped crusader, which led to another eventful meeting with Robin, ending in a kiss as thanks for saving his life.

Throughout time the Spoiler had become an active crimefighter in the suburbs near the vicinity of her home in Widowstone Creek. She had also began to develop a partnership with Robin despite Batman's disapproval. Within their flirtatious episodes the Spoiler and Robin began to dating, although she was still unaware of Robin's actual identity. Later, around the time of the cataclysmic earthquake that devastated Gotham City, Stephanie found out that she was pregnant by her previous boyfriend, which led her to momentarily retire as the Spoiler. Afterwards, she gave birth to a baby girl and decided to put her up for adoption in order for her not to grow up without a father like she experienced. Soon after she resumed her duties as the Spoiler and was taken under Batman for proper training after he revealed Robin's secret identity.

In addition to training from Batman, Stephanie also received training from Batgirl and the Birds of Prey for a brief period under the leadership of Oracle. Forming a close Bond with Batgirl and Spoiler performed many feats such as Young Justice's invasion of Zandia. However, most of her activities were limited to the greater Gotham area. Some roles Stephanie has been known to carry other than the Spoiler have been the fourth Robin as well as the third Batgirl within the DC franchise. As far as the Batman comics go Stephanie was the only one to assume both roles within the mainstream continuity. However both roles were either short lived or called into question as Batman fired Stephanie for disobeying a direct order in the field, for if she cannot be trusted there she cannot be trusted with his life. Stephanie was also called into question of being responsible enough to presume the role as the new Batgirl due to her inadvertent causation of the gang war that shook Gotham after stealing Batman's plans.

After some trials and foiling the drug trade schemed by Scarecrow and the second Black mask Barbara Gordon, oracle, approved of Stephanie being the new Batgirl as she showed a new level of Maturity and responsibility for previous deeds. Soon after Barbara took on a position at Stephanie's school in order to keep close on her as well as being a direct point of contact regarding crime and other matters. Barbara also designed a new costume for Stephanie in order to replace the previous Batgirl's, Cassandra Cain, and incorporate both elements of Spoiler and Batgirl, making her a legit edition to the Bat family.

Batman: War Games 
Batman: War Games is a major comic book series arc published by DC Comics from October 2004 to January 2005. DC Comics runs all other family titles of the famous Batman comics. The comic book centered around a war that took place between the major crime groups in the city of Gotham. Batman develops a plan to control the criminals' gang violence by forming a huge debacle that would lead to all crime gangs to join forces under the authority of one leader, Matches Malone, a big crime boss who is actually an ally of Batman.

Stephanie Brown, who formerly served as Robin the sidekick to Batman, finds out what Batman is up to. She previously thought Malone and Batman were two different people, not knowing they were one of the same. Brown is fired from the position of being Robin, and attempts to get back on Batman's good side and regain his trust. She returns to her former self, Spoiler, and groups all the crime gangs into one spot without Batman's knowledge. However, the meeting goes awry and ends in multiple henchmen and villains to kill each other. This is what causes all the gangs of Gotham to go at war with one another.

In the midst of the pandemonium, Black Mask gains control of all the gangs by abducting Stephanie. Black Mask tortures her for inside information and in turn, becomes the most powerful crime boss of Gotham city. When Stephanie dies from Black Mask's torture, Batman is devastated and blames himself for her death.

Stephanie's death resulted in Black Mask becoming the only crime boss to rule over Gotham. Commissioner Akins also made all vigilantes into criminals and Doctor Leslie Thompkins against Batman, who actually let Stephanie die from her injuries when she could've saved her, in her anger of Batman letting children get involved in his war on crime. In comics after this volume, the War Games led to Batman finally being exposed to more than just legend and rumor. He was caught on surveillance footage trying to save the life of an injured student. In addition, Barbara Gordon would later lose her headquarters, the clock tower, and move to Metropolis. Though we don't see her character for a while, later on in the comics, she reconnects with Batman again.

The death of Stephanie Brown would also lead to some confusion when her character re-appeared in Gotham Underground and Robin as a mysterious vigilante wearing the Spoiler costume who is later to be revealed as Stephanie herself. Writer Chuck Dixon re-wrote her story in Robin #174 when he wrote that her body has been switched with a deceased girl with a similar body type, eluding to Dr. Thompkins having treated Stephanie in secret.

Synopsis
The issue is told predominately from the perspective of Spoiler, and much of the writing is her internal monologue.

All of Gotham's crime bosses come together with a single bodyguard each for a meeting that had been called through an anonymous letter. Spoiler and Catwoman observe them when the nervousness of the crime bosses causes them to begin firing at each other, creating a bloodbath. While this occurs, Batman is at a public gathering as Bruce Wayne when Kobra terrorists break in. He manages to get most people to safety and enter his Batman costume, however upon stopping the terrorists he receives a cryptic message about how the terrorists knew Batman would underestimate Kobra.

Spoiler faces her immediate predecessor as Robin, Tim Drake, and he is furious at her knowing his secret identity. Catwoman shows up and is surprised when she sees Spoiler there to "cover the situation". Spoiler admits to being fired and Catwoman encourages her to call in Batman when the nervousness of the crime bosses causes them to begin firing at each other, creating a bloodbath.

Catwoman tells Spoiler to call Batman, but Spoiler is already running away from the entire situation. Spoiler is grateful nobody was there to witness her failure and she accepts the fact that Batman fired her. She believes it was for the better and it was right of him to do so. She cannot help him in any way.

The issues are told predominantly from the perspective of Spoiler, and much of the writing is her internal monologue.

Criticism and reviews

Readers of Batman: The 12 Cent Adventure were not pleased with what had been presented to them. Given the fact that the price was marketed for so low was an indication for the quality of the work that would be flushed out within the publication. Sage from Jogro.org had expressed their displeasure with the comic due to a multitude of reasons; first, given the fact that they feel as though Spoiler should be written by specific authors and not everyone is up to snuff in that department. One author in particular that came to mind was Chuck Dixon as he was the only able to do her justice and not completely botch her character. Sage goes further to note that Spoiler had little no character development in this particular one shot and was made into a rather underdeveloped and unwanted character. This is expressed when Sage discloses: "All things considered, she has been the most screwed over and left out of the "Bat-clique"—Robin was almost always a jerk to her, the Birds of Prey refused to continue training her, and just recently, Batman fired her from being Robin". (Sage-jorgo.org). However, there were some redeeming qualities within the comic that Devin Grayson did well.

For example, what Grayson touched on eloquently was that there was the emotional depth that Stephanie was going through in this time of turmoil, along with the set up for the upcoming Bat-crossover that produced several volumes soon after. When it came to the art produced by Ramon Bach there were no complaints, in fact there was nothing but praises shared. Sage states: "It has a "feel" to it that's perfect for Gotham City and its group of avengers. Its so good I'd be happy if he did all the Bat-books". (Sage- Jorgo.org) Nevertheless, there were several things in this book that just did not work out properly, coming back the internal conflict of Stephanie.

Even though Grayson was able to convey emotion smoothly as well as dynamically there was a bit too much of it. The overall emotions made Spoiler look far more inexperienced that she has ever been, especially in regards to her shirking her responsibilities to stopping the blood bath that is right under her due to her depression from being dumped by Tim and not chosen to be Robin. She was supposed to be the heroine of the story, but all the fans received was a pitiful hero who wanted to be accepted and forgetting what it means to be in the bat family business. A rather shocking feat as Devin Grayson produces far better work than what was produced in this the inexpensive escapade. In fact, given her status as a writer for previous DC Comics and the array of the genres she worked with would make her one of the best suitable to write a compelling story. This led to speculation from whether or not Spoiler's arc will continue to be carried out within the crossovers due to the subpar storytelling.

One critic from "Comics Nexus" was "completely underwhelmed" because of the lack of history the 12 cent comic gives of each character. The critic describes it as not having enough background for a prelude to the incredible War Games series.

References

See also
 List of Batman comics

Batman titles
DC Comics one-shots